The Azure Dragon (Chinese:  Qīnglóng), also known as Qinglong in Chinese, is one of the Dragon Gods who represent the mount or chthonic forces of the Five Regions' Highest Deities ( Wǔfāng Shàngdì). He is also one of the Four Symbols of the Chinese constellations, which are the astral representations of the Wufang Shangdi. The Azure Dragon represents the east and the spring season. It is also sometimes referred to as the Blue-green Dragon, Green Dragon, or the Blue Dragon ( Cānglóng).  

The Dragon is frequently referred to in the media, feng shui, other cultures, and in various venues as the Green Dragon and the Avalon Dragon. His cardinal direction's epithet is "Bluegreen Dragon of the East" ( Dōngfāng Qīnglóng or  Dōngfāng Cānglóng). 

This dragon is also known as Seiryū in Japanese, Cheongryong in Korean and Thanh Long in Vietnamese.

Seven Mansions of the Azure Dragon
As with the other three Symbols, there are seven astrological "Mansions" (positions of the Moon) within the Azure Dragon. The names and determinative stars are:

Cultural depictions 

The Azure Dragon's Star is reincarnated as General Shan Xiongxin, who serves Wang Shichong. The two generals are sworn brothers of Qin Shubao, Cheng Zhijie and Yuchi Gong. After death, their souls are said to possess heroes of the Tang dynasty and Goguryeo, such as Xue Rengui and Yeon Gaesomun.

The Azure Dragon appears as a door god at Taoist temples. He was represented on the tomb of Wang Hui (stone coffin, east side) at Xikang in Lushan. A rubbing of this was collected by David Crockett Graham and is in the Field Museum of Natural History. The dragon featured on the Chinese national flag in 1862-1912, and on the Twelve Symbols national emblem from 1913-1928.

The Azure Dragon also appears as an opponent in the Nintendo DS fighting game Animal Boxing, going by the name Seiryu.

Influence

Japan
In Japan, the Azure Dragon is one of the four guardian spirits of cities and is believed to protect the city of Kyoto on the east. The west is protected by the White Tiger, the north is protected by the Black Tortoise, the south is protected by the Vermilion Bird, and the center is protected by the Yellow Dragon. In Kyoto, there are temples dedicated to each of these guardian spirits. The Azure Dragon is represented in the Kiyomizu Temple in eastern Kyoto. Before the entrance of the temple there is a statue of the dragon, which is said to drink from the waterfall within the temple complex at nighttime. Therefore, each year a ceremony is held to worship the dragon of the east. In 1983, the Kitora Tomb was found in the village of Asuka. All four guardians were painted on the walls (in the corresponding directions) and a system of the constellations was painted on the ceiling. This is one of the few ancient records of the four guardians.

Korea
In Korea, the murals of the Goguryeo tombs found at Uhyon-ni in South Pyongan province features the Azure Dragon and the other mythological creatures of the four symbols.

Gallery

See also 
Chinese dragon

References

External links

Chinese constellations
Chinese dragons
Chinese gods
Four Symbols
Guardians of the directions
Onmyōdō deities